Acuphoceropsis is a genus of flies in the family Tachinidae. It contains only one species, Acuphoceropsis nigricornis.

References

Further reading

External links

 

Tachinidae
Monotypic Brachycera genera